St. Paul's Abbey is a Roman Catholic Benedictine monastery in Newton, New Jersey. It was founded by Father Michael Heinlein, a monk of the German Archabbey of St. Ottilien, as a monastery on March 15, 1924.

Agricultural and community work are the two most important activities of the monastery. Growing hay and Christmas trees as well as helping in local parishes, hospital work, and a myriad of other jobs keep monks actively involved in the local community. Several monks have also served in missions in Africa.

History
The monastery was promoted to the grade of conventual priory on May 2, 1936, and later to abbey on June 9, 1947.

In the late 1970s, St. Paul's Abbey ceased to operate and fell into disrepair. In 2000, the remaining monks asked for permission from the governing Ottilien Congregation to leave and start looking for new homes at other abbeys.

The story of one of the monks, known as "Brother Marinus", inspired Father Kim of the Waegwan Abbey in Korea to provide help in restoring the monastery.

References

http://www.inkamana.org/ohio/newton.htm

Benedictine monasteries in the United States
1924 establishments in New Jersey
Newton, New Jersey